This is a list of the 1989 PGA Tour Qualifying School graduates. 59 players earned their 1990 PGA Tour card through Q-School in 1989.

Source:

References

PGA Tour Qualifying School
PGA Tour Qualifying School Graduates
PGA Tour Qualifying School Graduates